Cuxton railway station is on the Medway Valley Line in Kent, England, and lies well to the east of the village of Cuxton. The station and all trains that serve the station are operated by Southeastern.

History 
The APTIS-equipped ticket office, in an imposing building on the northbound platform, closed in September 1989; the building remains disused and is in poor condition although some efforts have been made in recent years to stem the decay and deter vandalism.

A PERTIS (Permit to Travel) ticket machine is located at the entrance to the northbound platform; this was installed in 2007.

The wooden level crossing gates were replaced with manually operated barriers controlled from the signalbox.

Services

All services at Cuxton are operated by Southeastern using  EMUs.

The typical off-peak service in trains per hour is:
 2 tph to 
 2 tph to  via 

On Sundays, the service is reduced to hourly in each direction.

References

External links

Railway stations in Medway
DfT Category F2 stations
Transport in Medway
Former South Eastern Railway (UK) stations
Railway stations in Great Britain opened in 1856
Railway stations served by Southeastern
1856 establishments in England